Nicholas William Ross (born 26 July 1990) is a New Zealand field hockey player.

Career

Club level
In the New Zealand National Hockey League, Ross plays hockey for Southern.

National team
Nick Ross made his debut for the Black Sticks in 2013, at the Sultan Azalan Shah Cup, in Ipoh, Malaysia.

Since his debut, Ross has been a regular inclusion in the Black Sticks side. During his career he has medalled three times, winning silver at the 2018 Commonwealth Games and the 2015 and 2017 Oceania Cups.

His most recent appearance for the national team was during the inaugural tournament of the FIH Pro League, where New Zealand finished in last place.

International goals

References

External links
 
 
 
 
 

1990 births
Living people
New Zealand male field hockey players
Male field hockey midfielders
2018 Men's Hockey World Cup players
Commonwealth Games silver medallists for New Zealand
Commonwealth Games medallists in field hockey
Field hockey players at the 2018 Commonwealth Games
Field hockey players at the 2020 Summer Olympics
Olympic field hockey players of New Zealand
Sportspeople from Dunedin
2023 Men's FIH Hockey World Cup players
Medallists at the 2018 Commonwealth Games